Thomasville Heights was a 350-unit public housing project in Atlanta, Georgia, built in 1967, demolished in 2010, and the remainder of the Thomasville community which is section-8 housing Forest Cove Apartments(also known as Villa Monte aka 4 Season) is also scheduled to be demolished. Forest Cove (formerly Villa Monte) was constructed in 1971 with 404 units originally owned by the Atlanta Housing Authority. Like all of atlanta other housing projects it deteriorated and became very dangerous throughout the late 70s,80s and 90s. After being scheduled to be demolished in 1999, a private investor bought and made plans to renovate turning the community into a section8 housing project which are one of the main reasons they still exist today. Still to this day it remains one of the most dangerous housing project Atlanta has left.  The project made national headlines in the 1970s and 1980s with the child abduction cases and the murder of Officer Johantgen.

References

Buildings and structures demolished in 2010
Demolished buildings and structures in Atlanta
Residential buildings in Atlanta
Residential buildings completed in 1967
1967 establishments in Georgia (U.S. state)
2010 disestablishments in Georgia (U.S. state)